Protuberodrilus is a genus of annelids belonging to the family Naididae.

The species of this genus are found in Spain.

Species:

Protuberodrilus tourenqui

References

Annelids